Stéphane Cauterman (born 26 December 1968) is a French gymnast. He competed in eight events at the 1988 Summer Olympics.

References

1968 births
Living people
French male artistic gymnasts
Olympic gymnasts of France
Gymnasts at the 1988 Summer Olympics
Sportspeople from Roubaix